Li Tao is the name of:

People surnamed Li
Li Tao (Five Dynasties) (898–961), official during the Five Dynasties and Song dynasty 
Li Tao (historian) (1115–1184), Song dynasty historian who authored Xu Zizhi Tongjian Changbian
Li Tao (psychiatrist) (born 1965), Chinese psychiatrist
Li Tao (sprinter) (born 1968), Chinese sprinter
Li Tao (swimmer) (born 1968), Chinese male swimmer

People surnamed Tao
Tao Li (born 1990), Chinese-born Singaporean female swimmer